Nancy Dahlstrom is an American politician who is serving as the 15th lieutenant governor of Alaska, since December 2022. She previously served as a Republican member of the Alaska House of Representatives, representing the 18th and 13th districts. She was appointed to the House at the beginning of the legislative session in 2003 when the representative-elect, Lisa Murkowski, was appointed to her father's U.S. Senate seat.  Dahlstrom resigned her House seat to take a position in the administration of Governor Sean Parnell, then resigned from that position after less than a month when constitutional issues arose. 

She later served be elected back to the House 2018. However, she would decline to be seated, instead she would accept a position in the administration of Governor Mike Dunleavy. Governor Dunleavy would appoint Sharon Jackson to fill the full-term vacancy.

Legislative career
Dahlstrom was serving as Co-Chair of the Armed Services Committee, Vice-Chair of the Judiciary Committee and the Legislative Budget & Audit Committee, and was a member of the Economic Development, Trade & Tourism Special Committee and the Energy Special Committee. She also served on the Environmental Conservation, Health & Social Services, Military & Veterans' Affairs and the Public Safety Finance Subcommittees, for the 26th Legislature. She spoke publicly while campaigning about reducing crime, both in her district and in the entire state of Alaska. She was elected back to the state house in 2018 but refused to be seated after accepting the position of Commissioner for the Department of Corrections.

Personal life
Representative Dahlstrom has a husband: Kit and four children and nine grandchildren. Nancy Dahlstrom graduated from the Skyview High School, Smithfield, Utah in 1975, received her Associate of Science in 1992 and her Bachelor of Science in 1994 for Human Services and Business from Wayland Baptist University, and received her Master's degree in Organization Management and Human Resource from University of LaVerne in 1997.

References

External links
 Alaska State House Majority Site
 Alaska State Legislature Biography
 Project Vote Smart profile
 Nancy Dahlstrom at 100 Years of Alaska's Legislature

|-

 

 

1957 births
21st-century American politicians
21st-century American women politicians
Alaska Republicans
Lieutenant Governors of Alaska
Living people
Republican Party members of the Alaska House of Representatives
Politicians from Anchorage, Alaska
Politicians from Baltimore
Women state legislators in Alaska